The Solecurtidae are a family of saltwater clams, marine bivalve molluscs in the order Cardiida.

Genera
Genera in the family Solenidae include:
 Azorinus Récluz, 1869
 Clunaculum Dall, 1899
 Solecurtus Blainville, 1824
 Tagelus Gray, 1847

References

External links

 

 
Bivalve families